Pwaga is a small town in Mpwapwa District, Dodoma region, central Tanzania.

Populated places in Dodoma Region